Dimini (older form: Diminion) is a village near the city of Volos, in Thessaly (central Greece), in Magnesia. It was the seat of the municipality of Aisonia. The name Aisonia dates back to ancient times and it is the westernmost place in the Volos area. The Dimini area contains both a Mycenean settlement and a Neolithic settlement. The Neolithic settlement in Dimini was discovered near the end of the 19th century and was first excavated by the archaeologists Christos Tsountas and Valerios Stais.

The palace of ancient Iolcos is believed to be located in modern-day Dimini, where a Mycenaean palace was excavated recently.

Population

History

Neolithic
Dimini culture is well known for its abstract painted vessels. Dimini ware is characteristic of the Later Neolithic period in eastern Thessaly, although it was traded and imitated outside the region and has been identified as far away as Cakran in Albania.

Antiquity
In 1886, Lolling and Wolters excavated the Mycenean tholos tomb known as Lamiospito. In 1901, Valerios Stais discovered the tholos tomb on the hill of the Neolithic settlement. He worked at the Dimini settlement with Christos Tsountas from 1901 up until 1903. In 1977, George Chourmouziadis continued excavations at the Neolithic settlement. Excavations of the Mycenean settlement in Dimini began in 1980 by V. Adrimi-Sismani. In 2001 the excavations uncovered a Mycenaean city and palace complex they believe could be part of ancient Iolkos. A stone weight and a sherd inscribed with Linear B writing were also uncovered.

The "invasion theory" states that the people of the Neolithic Dimini culture were responsible for the violent conquest of the Sesklo culture at around 5000 BC. Moreover, the theory considers the "Diminians" and the "Seskloans" as two separate cultural entities. However, I. Lyritzis provides a different story pertaining to the relations between the Dimini and the Sesklo cultures. He, along with R. Galloway, compared ceramic materials from both Sesklo and Dimini utilizing thermoluminescence dating methods. He discovered that the inhabitants of the settlement in Dimini appeared around 4800 BC, four centuries before the fall of the Sesklo civilization (ca. 4400 BC). Lyritzis concluded that the "Seskloans" and "Diminians" coexisted for a period of time.

See also 

Boian culture
Butmir Culture
Cucuteni–Trypillia culture
Funnelbeaker culture
Gumelniţa–Karanovo culture
Hamangia culture
Karanovo culture
Lengyel culture
Linear Pottery culture
Sesklo culture
Starčevo culture
Tisza culture
Varna culture
Vinča culture
Helladic chronology
Mycenaean Greece
Neolithic Greece
Old Europe
Sesklo and Dimini fortifications

Notes and references
Notes

References

External links

Hellenic Ministry of Culture: Dimini
Metis: Dimini
Photos of the Dimini settlement, Magnesia (in Greek)

Populated places established in the 5th millennium BC
Populated places in Magnesia (regional unit)
Neolithic settlements in Thessaly
Mycenaean sites in Thessaly
Archaeological cultures of Southern Europe
Neolithic cultures of Europe
Archaeological cultures in Greece
Iolcus